Mirko Lulić (born 6 January 1962) is a Croatian former football player. He spent his career playing in the top flights of Yugoslavia and later Croatia.

Club career
Born in Kosa Janjačka, SR Croatia while still within SFR Yugoslavia, Lulić played with NK Osijek from 1979 until 1984.  According to various internet player history pages, in 1988 he moved to one of their main Yugoslav First League rivals, Red Star Belgrade where he played the 1988–89 season. But, that is not correct fact. During 1988-89 season, he played for Dinamo both in European matches in October 1988 and in Yugoslav league matches during 1989 spring. Match reports of both teams are the proof.

After 1988-89 season, he did not play serious professional football actively for three years. In summer 1992 he returned to football but Dinamo Zagreb did not give him a chance for playing so he went to play the following season for second tier club NK Dubrava helping it win a promotion.  While playing for Dubrava on December 18th 1992 he was in team in the international friendly match against Albania national football team. 
  
Later, in 1993 he returned to Dinamo Zagreb, renamed by then to Croatia Zagreb, and played the first half of the 1993–94 season, now in an independent Croatian First League.  During the winter break of that season he returned to NK Osijek, and played with Osijek in the Croatian championship until 1996.

Honours
Dinamo Zagreb
Croatian Cup: 1994

References

1962 births
Living people
People from Perušić
Association football defenders
Yugoslav footballers
Croatian footballers
NK Osijek players
GNK Dinamo Zagreb players
NK Dubrava players
Yugoslav First League players
Croatian Football League players